Harry Hill (born Matthew Keith Hall, 1964) is an English comedian, author and television presenter

Harry Hill is also the name of:

 Harry Hill (sportsman) (1827–1896), English-born American businessman, sportsman and saloonkeeper
 Harry W. Hill (politician) (1886 - 1954), Arizona state senator
 Harry W. Hill (admiral) (1890–1971), American admiral
 USS Harry W. Hill, American warship named after the admiral
 Tiny Hill (Harry Lawrence Hill, 1906–1971), American bandleader
 Harry Hill (cyclist) (1916–2009), British cyclist
 Harry Hill (TV series), television programme featuring the comedian

See also
 The Harry Hill Movie, British comedy film (2013) featuring the comedian
 Harry Hill's Fruit Corner, British radio show (1993–1997) featuring the comedian
 Harry Hill's Real Life Adventures in TV Land, comic strip in The Dandy featuring a cartoon version of the comedian
 Harry Hill's Shark Infested Custard, British children's television series (2005–2006) featuring the comedian
 Harry Hills (1886–after 1919), English cricketer
 Henry Hill (disambiguation)
 Hill (surname)